The Paradoxosomatidae is one of the largest families of millipedes, consisting of nearly 1,000 species in approximately 200 genera. The genera are divided into three subfamilies and 22 tribes. Most species (over 760) belong to the subfamily Paradoxosomatinae. This list includes all valid genera as of 2013, sorted by subfamily and tribe.

Alogolykinae

Alogolykini
 Alogolykus
 Delarthrum
 Hirtodrepanum
 Orophosoma
 Pocockina
 Tetracentrosternus
 Touranella
 Yuennanina

Polydrepanini
Armolites
Curiosoma
Dasypharkis
Gyrodrepanum
Hindomorpha
Martensosoma
Polydrepanum
Singhalorthomorpha
Telodrepanum
Xiphidiogonus

Australiosomatinae

Antichiropodini

Aethalosoma 
Antichiropus
 Aulacoporus
 Australodesmus
 Borneochiropus
 Brochopeltis
 Dicranogonus
 Euphyodesmus
 Helicopodosoma
 Howeosoma
 Mjoebergodesmus
 Notodesmus
 Parwalesoma
 Pogonosternum
 Pseudostrongylosoma
 Solaenodolichopus
 Stygiochiropus
 Tridactylogonus
 Walesoma

Aschistodesmini
 Aschistodesmus
 Dendrogonopus
 Dorcadogonus
 Haplochiropus

Australiosomatini

 Akamptogonus
 Archicladosoma
 Australiosoma
 Boreohesperus
 Cladethosoma
 Dicladosoma
 Dicladosomella
 Gigantowales
 Heterocladosoma
 Hoplatessara
 Hoplatria
 Isocladosoma
 Myallosoma
 Oncocladosoma
 Orocladosoma
 Paraustraliosoma
 Perittogonopus
 Phyllocladosoma
 Somethus
 Streptocladosoma

Paradoxosomatinae

Catharosomatini
Broelemannopus
Catharosoma
Gonodrepanoides
Gonodrepanum
Habrodesmoides
Iulidesmus
Mogyella
Mogyosoma
Montesecaria
Ologonosoma
Promestosoma
Pseudogonodrepanum

Centrodesmini 
Centrodesmus
Pleuroporodesmus

Chamberliniini 

Aponedyopus
Chamberlinius
Geniculodesmus
Haplogonosoma
Riukiupeltis
Simplogonomorpha

Cnemodesmini 
Aklerobunus
Allochresimus
Anaclastopus
Campsogon
Cnemodesmella
Cnemodesmina
Cnemodesmus
Dysmathogonus
Ectodesmus
Lundasoma
Nasmodesosoma
Phaeodesmus
Podochresimus
Pyragrogonus

Eroonsomatini 
Eroonsoma
Metonomastus

Eustrongylosomatini 
Astromontosoma
Diglossosternoides
Eustrongylosoma
Nothrosoma
Perittotresis
Selminosoma
Silvattia

Eviulisomatini 

Boreviulisoma
Eoseviulisoma
Eviulisoma
Onciurosoma
Scolodesmus
Wubidesmus

Graphisternini 
Ergethus
Graphisternum

Nedyopodini 
Nedyopus

Orthomorphini 

Antheromorpha
Asiomorpha
Carinorthomorpha
Cleptomorpha
Dajakina
Desmoxytes
Diglossosternum
Eudasypeltis
Gigantomorpha 
Luzonomorpha
Malayorthomorpha  
Nepalomorpha
Nesorthomorpha  
Orangutana
Orthomorpha
Orthomorphoides  
Parorthomorpha
Piccola
Sapamorpha
Shelleyomorpha  
Sinomorpha
Topalosoma

Paradoxosomatini 
Ciliciosoma
Enghoffosoma
Haplogonomorpha
Lohmanderodesmus
Stosatea
Strongylosoma
Substrongylosoma
Tetrarthrosoma

Sulciferini 

Annamina
Anoplodesmus
Belousoviella
Cawjeekelia
Chapanella
Chondromorpha
Echinopeltis
Gonobelus
Harpagomorpha
Hedinomorpha
Hoffmanina
Inversispina
Kaschmiriosoma
Kronopolites
Mandarinopus
Margaritosoma
Oranmorpha
Orthomorphella
Oxidus
Parchondromorpha
Sellanucheza
Sichotanus
Sigipinius
Tylopus
Vietnamorpha
Wulingina

Sundaninini 
Arthrogonopus
Batakina
Borneonina 
Chinomorpha
Kalimantanina
Opisthodolichopus
Pseudosundanina
Sumatreonina
Sundanina
Sundaninella

Tectoporini 

Caloma
Helicorthomorpha
Leiozonius
Paternostrana
Tectoporus

Tonkinosomatini 
Tonkinosoma

Xanthodesmini 
Habrodesmus
Laterogonopus
Streptogonopus
Xanthodesmus

Uncertain tribal position 
Antichirogonus
Atropisoma
Desmoxytoides  
Habrodesmella
Laviusoma
Polylobosoma  
Tholerosoma
Trogodesmus

References

Paradoxosomatidae
Paradoxosomatidae